Haurakia sufflava is a species of minute sea snail, a marine gastropod mollusk or micromollusk in the family Rissoidae.

Description

Distribution
This marine species occurs off South Madagascar.

References

 Cecalupo A. & Perugia I. (2009). New species from South Madagascar (1^ note). Malacologia Mostra Mondiale, 63(2) : 20

External links

Rissoidae
Gastropods described in 2009